The National Socialists – Left of the 21st century (NS-LEV 21) also known as Left 21 was a left-wing political party in the Czech Republic founded in October 2011 by Jiří Paroubek, former Prime Minister and former leader of the Czech Social Democratic Party (ČSSD).

Former Prime Minister Jiří Paroubek was elected chairman of his newly founded party at the constituent congress on 26 November. In the year 2012, the party had two representatives in the 200-seat Chamber of Deputies, Paroubek and Jiří Šlégr (ex-CSSD).

The party name is a reference to the historical Czech National Social Party, and as such they do not advocate for Nazism. LEV 21 wants to follow up the tradition of the socialist nationalists in the First Czechoslovak Republic. Nevertheless, in the 2017 Czech legislative election, LEV 21 allied with the Czech Neo-Nazi party,  Workers' Party of Social Justice.

Election results

Chamber of Deputies

See also
Czech National Social Party
Czech National Socialist Party

References

External links
National Socialists Official website

Political parties established in 2011
Political parties disestablished in 2022
Social democratic parties in the Czech Republic
2011 establishments in the Czech Republic
Left-wing parties in the Czech Republic
Czech National Social Party
Czech Social Democratic Party breakaway groups